The boys' 50 metre freestyle event at the 2010 Youth Olympic Games took place on August 17, at the Singapore Sports School.

Medalists

Heats

Heat 1

Heat 2

Heat 3

Heat 4

Heat 5

Heat 6

Heat 7

Semifinals

Semifinal 1

Semifinal 2

Final

References
 Heat Results
 Semifinal Results
 Final Result

Swimming at the 2010 Summer Youth Olympics